Said-e-Havas (Prey  To Desire) or (Greed) also known as King John is a 1936 Hindi/Urdu film adaptation of the Shakespeare play, King John, directed by Sohrab Modi. It was based on the Urdu play Said-e-Hawas by Agha Hashar Kashmiri,  published in 1908.

Produced by Modi's Stage Film Company, the film was a "stage recording" of the play, similar to Modi's first stage adaptation to screen of Khoon Ka Khoon.  It was written by Agha Hashr, based on an adaptation of King John and of Richard III. The music was composed by Bunyad Husain Khan. The film starred Sohrab Modi, Gulzar, Sadat Ali, Fakir Mohammed, Shama and E. Tarapore.

Trivedi and Bartholomeusz record that the film incorporated scenes and acts from King John, mainly Act 2 Scene 5, and made use of Richard III as general reference. Modi played the role of the "ethnically black" Kazal Beg (Hubert). Agha Hashr had written the play in 1907 and according to Bishop and Chaudhuri, there is very little similarity between the play King John and Agha Hashr's adaptation, except for those mentioned earlier.

Cast
 Sohrab Modi
 Sadat Ali
 Gulzar
 Shama
 Chandra Kumar
 Fakir Mohammed
 E. Tarapore
 Ghulam Hussain
 Sarla Devi

Soundtrack
The film had music composed by Bunyad Hussain Khan and included eleven songs.

The song "Maston Ko Ain Farz Hai Peena Sharab Ka" was sung by legendary singer G. M. Durrani.

Song List

References

External links

1936 films
1930s Hindi-language films
Films directed by Sohrab Modi
Films based on King John (play)
Indian black-and-white films
Films based on works by William Shakespeare
Indian films based on plays